They Paid With Their Blood is a 1955 Turkish drama film directed by Osman F. Seden. The stars of the film are Eşref Kolçak, Neriman Köksal, Kenan Pars, Talat Artemel, Mualla Kaynak, Kadir Savun, and Tamer Balcı.

References

External links
 
 

1955 films
Turkish drama films
1955 drama films
Turkish black-and-white films